Gulf Corporation Ltd v Gulf Harbour Investments Ltd [2005] NZCA 121 (25 May 2005); [2006] 1 NZLR 21; (2005) 6 NZCPR 412 is a cited case in New Zealand regarding  the termination of conditional contracts.

References

Court of Appeal of New Zealand cases
New Zealand contract case law
2005 in case law
2005 in New Zealand law